Tracy Louise Somerset, Duchess of Beaufort (née Ward; born 22 December 1958) is a British duchess, environmental activist, and former actress. She is usually known as Tracy Worcester, the married style that she often used before 2017, and as an actress was credited as Tracy-Louise Ward. She was previously married to Henry Somerset, 12th Duke of Beaufort.

Life and work
Born in Kensington, Tracy Louise Ward is a daughter of the Hon. Peter Alistair Ward, a younger son of William Ward, 3rd Earl of Dudley. Her father became chairman of the family business, Baggeridge Brick. His first wife, Clare Leonora Baring, was the only child of the gentleman cricketer Giles Baring. Tracy Beaufort is the sister of the actress Rachel Ward. She also has one brother and two half-brothers. Her great-grandfather William Ward, 2nd Earl of Dudley, was Lord Lieutenant of Ireland in the early 20th century, and then Governor-General of Australia. The son of William Ward, 1st Earl of Dudley, and Georgina, Countess of Dudley, he owned nearly 30,000 acres in Staffordshire and Worcestershire, two hundred coal and iron mines, and several iron works, including the Round Oak Steelworks.

Tracy Ward grew up on her father's estate at Cornwell, Oxfordshire. After gaining three 'A'-levels, she went to Paris as a model, and then to work at Christie's in London, before working in art galleries in New York City. In her early twenties, she trained for an acting career at the Academy of Live and Recorded Arts, London, and the London Drama School.

As an actress, she is best remembered for her role as Tessa Robinson in the television detective series C.A.T.S. Eyes (1986–1987). She also appeared in the film Dance with a Stranger and the Doctor Who serial Timelash, both in 1985, and played the first Miss Scarlett in the television drama game show Cluedo (1990). Her theatre credits include: Our Day Out (Nottingham Playhouse) and Intimacy (Cafe Theatre). 

On 13 June 1987, she married Henry, Marquess of Worcester, known to his friends as Bunter Worcester, a farmer and chartered surveyor who was son and heir of David Somerset, 11th Duke of Beaufort. Charles, Prince of Wales, and Diana, Princess of Wales, both attended the wedding. They were divorced in 2018, after he had succeeded his father as Duke of Beaufort. They have three children: 
 Henry Robert FitzRoy Somerset, Marquess of Worcester (born 1989)
 Lady Isabella Somerset (born 1991)
 Lord Alexander Somerset (born 1993)

Campaigner
In 1989, Tracy Worcester began working with Friends of the Earth. Since then, she has been active in green politics as Associate Director of the International Society for Ecology and Culture, a trustee of The Gaia Foundation, the Trustee of The Schumacher Society and the Bath Environment Centre, on the Council of the UK's Soil Association, and a member of the International Forum on Globalisation. She was a member of the Referendum Party, which opposed Britain's involvement in the European Union.

Since 1989, Tracy has been networking, fund raising, writing, making documentaries and public speaking to promote a more local food economy. Her feature length films include Is Small Still Beautiful in India, and The Politics of Happiness in Bhutan. Most recently, she produced a documentary film called Pig Business, highlighting the environmental and health impacts of the intensive factory farming of low quality pork.

She founded and directs a campaign organisation called Farms Not Factories, which makes films and online content intended to encourage viewers to only buy meat with a high welfare label.

In 2013, she was signatory to a campaign for women to be able to inherit all peerages and entailed estates.

During the campaign for the 2015 general election, she was one of several public figures who endorsed the parliamentary candidacy of the Green Party's Caroline Lucas.

Ancestry

References

External links
http://farmsnotfactories.org
Pig Business The Film
 
Caroline Boucher "The green marchioness: Caroline Boucher meets eco warrior Tracy Worcester at home in Badminton". Observer Food Monthly Sunday 20 August 2006. Retrieved 20 June 2008.
Tracy Worcester Articles by Tracy Worcester The New Statesman.

1958 births
Living people
Alumni of the Academy of Live and Recorded Arts
English activists
English women activists
English television actresses
English environmentalists
English duchesses by marriage
Tracy
Actresses from London